Damburneya rudis is a species of plant in the family Lauraceae. It is found in El Salvador, Guatemala, and the Mexican state of Chiapas.

References

rudis
Flora of El Salvador
Flora of Guatemala
Flora of Chiapas
Taxonomy articles created by Polbot
Cloud forest flora of Mexico